The twentieth series of Made in Chelsea, a British structured-reality television programme began airing on 28 September 2020 and concluded after twelve episodes on 14 December. Following the suspension of filming of the previous series due to the COVID-19 pandemic, it was announced that the cast would be following government guidelines whilst filming this series. Some of the cast moved into country houses located in Surrey where they were quarantined together, whilst the others filmed with social distancing to protect cast and crew. The series ended with a special "Made in Chelsea: The Wedding" episode focused on the wedding of Ollie and Gareth, which was brought forward following the announcement of the second national lockdown. 

During the series it was confirmed that cast member Miles Nazaire had taken a break from the show. New cast members for this series include former Love Island contestant Charlie Frederick, as well as Paris Smith, Ruby Adler and Will Higginson. James Taylor and Maeva D'Ascanio also returned to the show following their short break, whilst former cast member Alexandra "Binky" Felstead made a brief return for the series finale.

The series focused heavily on the unstable relationship between Sam and Zara following a confession of infidelity, as well as a blossoming romance between Olivia and Tristan despite numerous obstacles. It also included Emily torn between her best friend and a new love interest, and the Gareth and Ollie desperately trying to plan the wedding of their dreams despite COVID-19 restrictions.

Cast

Episodes

Ratings
Catch-up service totals were added to the official ratings.

External links

References

2020 British television seasons
Made in Chelsea seasons